Wolfy is a 2009 Russian psychological drama film directed by Vasily Sigarev.

Plot 
The film tells about a girl whose mother is in prison. Returning home, she gives her daughter a small toy: Wolfy. By the way, this name is suitable for the girl herself, because she could have grown into a real wolf if she had not loved her mother so much.

Cast 
 Polina Pluchek as Daughter
 Yana Troyanova as Mother
 Veronika Lysakova as Older Daughter
 Marina Gapchenko as Grandma
 Galina Kuvshinova as Sister
 Andrei Dymshakov as Uncle Kolya
 Elena Ilyina as lesbian
 Ivan Izhevsky as Cop at the Station
 Yevgeniy Volotskiy as First Policeman
 Aleksey Rozin as Second Policeman

Awards 

 2009 Kinotavr: Best Screenplay
 2009 Karlovy Vary International Film Festival: Don Quijote Award - Special Mention
 2009 Russian Guild of Film Critics: Best Film and Best Debut
 2009 Zurich Film Festival: International Feature Film

References

External links 
 

2009 films
2000s Russian-language films
2000s psychological drama films
2009 drama films
Russian drama films
Lesbian-related films